Twins Nete (in Italian Le Gemelle Nete) was an Italian musical group founded by the sisters Neta and Kina Costamagna in 1940.

Career
Anna (Neta) and Domenica (Kina) Costamagna were born in 1911 in Trinità, province of Cuneo, Italy. They started to work as tailors: Neta with shirts and China with embroidery.

In the 1940s they began, as autodidacts, to study music: Neta with the guitar and China with the mandolin. For more than 40 years they sang italian popular music: sweet and popular pieces of the workers or of the Italian economic miracle.

Kina died in 1990, but Neta continued to sing solo, or with other popular groups. In 2001, for the 90th birthday of China an artistic book about their work was published, with compliments by Renzo Arbore, Aldo Grasso, Michele Serra and many others.
 Neta died in 2002.

From the summer of 2011, the Municipality of Trinità has organised, every 2–3 years, the Nete Pride, in collaboration with popular Italian groups.

Discography 

Some of their most known songs are:

 Amor di pastorello
 Balocchi e profumi
 Canti nuovi
 Creola
 Donna
 La piccola fioraia
 Ladra
 Meglio sarebbe
 Miniera
 Nina panca
 Sogni d'oro
 Stornelli campagnoli
 Tic e tic, tac e tac (Gira, rigira biondina)
 Un bacio a mezzanotte

References

External links
 Twins Nete in Un bacio a mezzanotte on Youtube
 Twins Nete in Gira, rigira biondina on Youtube
 Trinità’s Municipality Site

Italian musical duos
Twin musical duos
Italian pop music groups
Female musical duos
1911 births
1990 deaths
2002 deaths